Fudbalski klub Stepojevac Vaga (Serbian Cyrillic: Фудбалски клуб Степојевац Вага) is a professional football club from Stepojevac, Lazarevac city, Serbia. They currently compete in the Serbian League Belgrade, the third tier of the national league system.

History
The club was founded in 1934. under the name of „Vita Petrović“. The name of the club was changed several times during its history up until 2011. when it got its current name.

Seasons

References

Football clubs in Serbia
Sport in Lazarevac